Koel Purie Rinchet is an Indian actress, producer and TV presenter.

About 
She made her debut with Rahul Bose's directorial venture Everybody Says I'm Fine! in 2001 and later featured in Road to Ladakh starring with Irrfan Khan. She trained at the  Royal Academy of Dramatic Art London. Since then she has worked on 20 films in India, the United Kingdom and Canada. She played Desdemona at the Leicester Haymarket. She has also acted in the theater production of A Taste for Mangoes (an adaptation of Willian Dalrymple's White Mughals). She has written for publications such as Cosmopolitan, DNA, Harper's Bazaar, and India Today. While living in Tokyo, Purie was appointed the Tourism Mascot by the Japanese government and shot several videos to promote tourism in Japan. Purie now lives in Paris and has started her own production company to make film, digital and video content for various platforms.

Purie hosted a talk show, On The Couch With Koel, on the Indian news channel Headlines Today. She has produced and hosted various TV shows from Great Escape for Star plus to Aaj Ki Naari for DD metro.

Koel Purie is the daughter of media tycoon Aroon Purie.

Filmography

 Everybody Says I'm Fine! (2001)
 American Daylight (2004)
 Road to Ladakh (2004)
 White Noise (2005)
 Nazar (2005)
 Mixed Doubles (2006)
 Mera Dil Leke Dekho (2006)
 The Lookalike (2006)
 Life Mein Kabhie Kabhiee (2007)
 Amal (2007)
 It's Breaking News (2007)
 The Great Indian Butterfly (2007)
 Secrets of the Seven Sounds (2008)
 Rock On! (2008)
 10ml LOVE (2012)
 The Zoya Factor (2019)

TV
The Great Escape- Star Plus
 Aaj Ki Naari....Deepika (all episodes)- DD Metro (1998)
Holby City (1 episode, 2003) - "For Better, for Worse" as Seleena Chowdhury
The Vice (1 episode, 2003) - "Gameboys" as WPC Charlie Carter
Indian Dream (2003) as Neeraj
As If (1 episode, 2004) - "Jamie's POV" as Travel Agent
Dirty War (2004) as DC Sameena Habibullah
The Afternoon Play (1 episode, 2005) - "Reverse Psychology" as Sonia Bhose
 Losing Gemma (2006)  as Coral
 Fairy Tales (1 episode, 2008) - "The Empress's New Clothes" as Shekeelia
On the Couch with Koël (2008-2012) - Headlines Today 
Couching with Koël (2013-2015) - India Today TV

References

External links 

 

Living people
Year of birth missing (living people)
Actresses from Delhi
Indian film actresses
Indian television actresses
Actresses in Hindi cinema
Actresses in Hindi television
Indian emigrants to France
Actresses from Paris
Indian expatriate actresses in the United States
Indian expatriate actresses in the United Kingdom
Indian expatriates in Japan
Indian expatriates in France
Alumni of RADA
21st-century Indian actresses